Invest Northern Ireland (Invest NI) is Northern Ireland's regional economic development agency. It is a non-departmental public body (NDPB) of the Department for the Economy (DfE). According to DETI's website it; "supports business growth and inward investment, promotes innovation, research and development and in-company training, encourages exports and supports local economic development and company start up."

About 
According to Invest NI's website: "Our role is to grow the economy by helping new and existing businesses to compete internationally, and by attracting new investment to Northern Ireland. We are part of the Department of Enterprise, Trade and Investment and provide strong government support for business by effectively delivering the Government’s economic development strategies, making the most efficient use of available resources. Invest NI offers the Northern Ireland business community a single organisation providing high-quality services, programs, support and expert advice.  
We principally support businesses in the manufacturing and tradeable services sectors."

According to disclosures under the American Foreign Agents Registration Act, Invest Northern Ireland is engaged in lobbying U.S. legislators or government bodies.

See also 
 Department for the Economy
 Economy of Northern Ireland
 US-Northern Ireland Investment Conference

References

External links 
 Invest NI
 DETI 
 nibusinessinfo.co.uk

Non-Departmental Public Bodies of the Northern Ireland Executive
Innovation in the United Kingdom
Investment promotion agencies
Economy of Northern Ireland